Manuel Alejandro Sanhouse Contreras (born 16 July 1975) is a Venezuelan footballer who currently is retired.

He has played for his national team and also had international spells at Chilean side Coquimbo Unido and Espoli.

References

External links 
 Sanhouse at Football–Lineups
 

1975 births
Living people
Association football goalkeepers
Venezuelan footballers
Venezuela international footballers
1999 Copa América players
2001 Copa América players
2004 Copa América players
Deportivo Italia players
Coquimbo Unido footballers
Caracas FC players
C.D. ESPOLI footballers
Deportivo Táchira F.C. players
Estudiantes de Mérida players
Trujillanos FC players
UA Maracaibo players
Asociación Civil Deportivo Lara players
Venezuelan expatriate footballers
Expatriate footballers in Chile
Venezuelan expatriate sportspeople in Chile
People from Mérida, Mérida